Barbara De Luca  (born ) is a retired Italian volleyball player. She was part of the Italy women's national volleyball team.

She played at the 1994 FIVB Volleyball Women's World Championship. On club level she played with Anthesis Modena.

Clubs
 Anthesis Modena (1994)

References

External links
http://www.cev.lu/Competition-Area/PlayerDetails.aspx?TeamID=3600&PlayerID=4838&ID=170
http://www.sanremonews.it/2011/05/18/leggi-notizia/argomenti/al-direttore-1/articolo/volley-caso-di-barbara-de-luca-intervento-dellex-nazionale-franco-magnetto.html
http://www.legavolleyfemminile.it/?p=5957

1975 births
Living people
Italian women's volleyball players
Place of birth missing (living people)